The Washington State League was a Class-D minor league baseball circuit in Washington state that existed for three seasons—from 1910 to 1912. Teams in the league included the Aberdeen Black Cats, Chehalis Gophers, Hoquiam Loggers, Centralia Pets, Montesano Farmers, Raymond Cougars, Tacoma Cubs, South Bend River Rats and Centralia Railroaders. The Washington State League was also the name of an independent baseball league in 1897.

History
The Washington State League played the 1897 season as an independent baseball league, with unknown teams and standings.

In 1910, the league reformed. The 1910 league was organized at a meeting in Hoquiam, Washington on March 6, 1910, as a six–team circuit with a 21–week schedule. It was approved to split the shares of tickets equally between the home and away teams, with ten percent of the ticket earnings given to the league for travel expenses. Walter A. MacFarlane was elected league president and W. E. Campbell was elected vice president. During the 1910 season, the salary cap was limited to $850 per month. 

In July 1910, Montesano Farmers second baseman Otto Moore was struck on the head with a baseball pitched by Harold Cross. As a result, Moore fell into a coma. 

The Raymond Cougars won the 1910 Washington State League championship with a record of 36 wins and 19 losses (.655 winning percentage).

The league reduced to four teams in 1911 and 1912, folding during its final season. The Centralia Pets and Chehalis Farmers won championships in those seasons.The league permanently folded on July 14, 1912.

Cities represented 
Aberdeen, WA: Aberdeen Black Cats 1910, 1912 
Centralia, WA: Centralia Pets 1911; Centralia Railroaders 1912
Chehalis, WA: Chehalis Gophers 1910; Chehalis Proteges 1911; Chehalis Farmers 1912 
Hoquiam, WA: Hoquiam Loggers 1910; Hoquiam Cougars 1912 
Montesano, WA: Montesano Farmers 1910 
Raymond, WA: Raymond Cougars 1910; Raymond Venetians 1911 
South Bend, WA: South Bend River Rats 1911 
Tacoma, WA: Tacoma Cubs 1910

Standings & statistics 
1910 Washington State League
 Hoquiam disbanded July 15; Tacoma disbanded July 18. 
 
1911 Washington State League 
 
 
1912 Washington State League
  Aberdeen disbanded July 10. The league disbanded July 14.

References

External links
Baseball Reference

Defunct baseball leagues in the United States

Sports leagues established in 1910
Defunct minor baseball leagues in the United States
Sports leagues disestablished in 1912